is a Japanese animated television series directed by Isao Takahata that aired in 1976. It is loosely based on a small part of the Italian novel Heart created by Edmondo De Amicis, i.e., a monthly tale (racconto mensile) From the Apennines to the Andes (Dagli Appennini alle Ande), widely expanded into a 52-episode epic.

The series was broadcast on World Masterpiece Theater (Calpis Children's Theater back then), an animation staple that showcased each year an animated version of a different classic book or story. It was originally titled From the Apennines to the Andes. Nippon Animation, producers of World Masterpiece Theater, adapted Cuore into a second anime television series in 1981, although this second series was not part of the WMT.

The series was dubbed into several languages and became an instant success in some countries, such as  Portugal, Brazil, Peru, Spain, Venezuela, Colombia, Germany, Chile, the Philippines, Malaysia, Turkey, Iran, the Arab world, and Israel. In Hebrew, the series is called HaLev, meaning The Heart (the name of the original novel that the anime series is based on; the latter was translated into Hebrew and was extremely popular in the 1990s in Israel). In some European and in Latin American countries the series is simply known as Marco. In Arabic the series was a huge success; it was called Wada'an Marco, meaning Goodbye Marco.

Plot
The plot of the series focuses on Marco, a boy who lives with his family in the harbor city of Genoa, Italy during a depression period in 1881. Marco's father, Pietro Rossi, is a manager of a hospital who dedicates his time to treating poor patients, and therefore the family has financial difficulties. His beloved mother, Anna Rossi, goes to Argentina to work as a maid to earn money for Marco. When the letters from his mother stop coming after an indication that she is sick, Marco fears the worst for her fate. Since his father is too busy working in his clinic and his older brother Tonio was sent to train as a locomotive driver in Milan, he is the only one free to go search for her.

Marco takes his older brother's pet monkey Amedeo and they sneak aboard the Andrea Doria, a ship bound for Brazil. In Brazil, Marco boards an immigrant ship and arrives in Buenos Aires, where he meets a puppeteer called Peppino and his family, whom he knew from Genoa. They accompany him to Bahía Blanca to try to locate his mother.

In Bahía Blanca, he discovers his uncle stole the letters which his mother had sent him. He returns to Buenos Aires and sails off on a ship to Rosario; there he tries to figure out how to get on a train to Córdoba. Marco's Italian friends collect money and buy him a train ticket. Marco arrives in Córdoba, and successfully finds the agricultural engineer Mister Mequinez. He tells Marco that his mother works for his brother in Tucumán and gives him enough money for a train ticket. But Marco ends up giving the money to a doctor to save the life of a poor girl he meets. Marco sneaks on the train, but he gets caught and tossed off in the middle of nowhere. A group of traveling Roma rescue him and give him an old donkey.

After a few days, the donkey dies and Marco continues to walk to Tucumán. He eventually arrives to his destination hungry and tired, and finds his mother. His mother is very sick and needs an operation, but she is too weak. As soon as she sees Marco, she regains her strength and manages to go through the surgery successfully.

At the end of the series, Marco and his mother return to Genoa, where the family is reunited.

Characters
Marco Rossi – a 9-year-old boy in search of his mother.
Amedeo – Tonio's pet monkey, that comes on the journey with Marco.
Anna Rossi – Marco's mother, who works in Argentina to support the family.
Antonio (Tonio) Rossi – Marco's older brother, who attends an engineer school.
Pietro Rossi – Marco's father, manager of a charity hospital in Genoa.
Fiorina – Marco's friend in Italy and Peppino's second daughter; she assists her father in his puppet theater business.
Peppino – a man who performs outdoor puppet shows for a living, with his daughters, Concetta, Fiorina and Giulietta.
Concetta – Peppino's elder daughter, who controls the puppets, also actress and dancer in his puppet show.
Giulietta – Fiorina's baby sister.
Francisco Merelli - Marco's uncle, he helped Anna to send money to Genoa.
Pablo Garcia - Marco's friend in Argentina, a boy with Native American Ancestry living in a slum, thought to be a Mestizo.
Juana Garcia - Pablo's younger sister.

Media
A condensed movie was released in the 1980s using edited footage from the TV run. Nippon Animation also re-animated 3000 Leagues as a feature-length film in 1999, with a theme song performed by Scottish pop superstar Sheena Easton ("Carry a Dream", which was included in her 1999 album called Home that was only released in Japan).

Anime

Movie versions

 is the movie edited by the staff of the anime television series. The theatrical release date was July 19, 1980. It was distributed by Toho Towa. It was screened at Toho Yoga group theater. The running time is 107 minutes.
 is the remake movie based on the TV animation series which Nippon Animation produced and released on April 2, 1999. The original staff did not participate in the direction and the script applied to the TV series. Moreover, under the influence of group negotiations to demand improvement of the voice actors, the original cast did not participate.

Reception
It was ranked 81st in a Top 100 Anime list by TV Asahi in September 2005. It was also ranked 20th in a TV Asahi list of the favorite television anime of 100 celebrities in 2006.

References

External links
 
 
 

1976 anime television series debuts
1980 anime films
1999 anime films
Adventure anime and manga
Animated films based on animated series
Fuji TV original programming
Historical anime and manga
Japanese animated films
Studio Ghibli
Television series set in the 1880s
Television shows set in Italy
Television shows set in Argentina
Television shows set in Brazil
World Masterpiece Theater series
Fictional Argentine people
Films based on works by Edmondo De Amicis
Works based on Heart (novel)